Bellinger River National Park is a national park in New South Wales, Australia, about 410 km north of Sydney. The main feature of the park is the Bellinger River and the unspoilt forests on its upper reaches. In a word, the untouched wilderness of steep slopes and valleys, with numerous waterfalls that further enhance the impression of this beautiful national park.

28 species of birds have been recorded in the park.

See also

 Protected areas of New South Wales

References 

National parks of New South Wales
Protected areas established in 1997
1997 establishments in Australia